Fetal proteins are high levels of proteins present during the fetal stage of development.  Often related proteins assume similar roles after birth or in the embryo, in which case the fetal varieties are called fetal isoforms.  Sometimes, the genes coding fetal isoforms occur adjacent to their adult homologues in the genome, and in those cases a locus control region often coordinates the transition from fetal to adult forms.  In other cases fetal isoforms can be produced by alternate splicing using fetal exons to produce proteins that differ in only a portion of their amino acid sequence.  In some situations the continuing expression of fetal forms can reveal the presence of a disease condition or serve as a treatment for diseases such as sickle cell anemia.  Some well known examples include:

 Alpha-fetoprotein (AFP), the predominant serum protein of the fetus which gives way to albumin in the adult. AFP is categorized as an oncofetal protein because it is also found in tumors. 
 Fetal hemoglobin, the fetal version of hemoglobin.
 Fetal Troponin T and Troponin I isoforms.

References 

Animal developmental biology